Spectacle Buttes are a pair of mountain summits located in the Entiat Mountains, a sub-range of the North Cascades, in Chelan County of Washington state. Spectacle Buttes are situated 77 miles northeast of Seattle in the Glacier Peak Wilderness, on land managed by the Wenatchee National Forest. Spectacle Buttes ranks 78th on Washington's highest 100 peaks, 81st on the "Bulger List", and seventh-highest in the Entiat Mountains. The nearest higher peak is Marmot Pyramid on Mount Maude,  to the west-northwest. Precipitation runoff from the peaks drains into headwaters of the Entiat River. The first ascent of the south peak was made by Rowland Tabor and Dwight Crowder on August 20, 1953.

Climate

Lying east of the Cascade crest, the area around Spectacle Buttes is a bit drier than areas to the west. Summers can bring warm temperatures and occasional thunderstorms. Most weather fronts originate in the Pacific Ocean, and travel northeast toward the Cascade Mountains. As fronts approach the North Cascades, they are forced upward by the peaks of the Cascade Range, causing them to drop their moisture in the form of rain or snowfall onto the Cascades (Orographic lift). As a result, the North Cascades experiences high precipitation, especially during the winter months in the form of snowfall. With its impressive height, Spectacle Buttes can have snow in late-spring and early-fall, and can be very cold in the winter.

Geology

The North Cascades features some of the most rugged topography in the Cascade Range with craggy peaks, ridges, and deep glacial valleys. Geological events occurring many years ago created the diverse topography and drastic elevation changes over the Cascade Range leading to the various climate differences. These climate differences lead to vegetation variety defining the ecoregions in this area.

The history of the formation of the Cascade Mountains dates back millions of years ago to the late Eocene Epoch. With the North American Plate overriding the Pacific Plate, episodes of volcanic igneous activity persisted.  In addition, small fragments of the oceanic and continental lithosphere called terranes created the North Cascades about 50 million years ago.

During the Pleistocene period dating back over two million years ago, glaciation advancing and retreating repeatedly scoured the landscape leaving deposits of rock debris. The "U"-shaped cross section of the river valleys are a result of recent glaciation. Uplift and faulting in combination with glaciation have been the dominant processes which have created the tall peaks and deep valleys of the North Cascades area.

See also

 Geography of Washington (state)
 Geology of the Pacific Northwest
 Ice Box

Gallery

References

External links
 Weather forecast: South Spectacle Butte
 South Spectacle Butte aerial photo: PBase
 North Spectacle Butte aerial photo: PBase

North Cascades
Mountains of Washington (state)
Mountains of Chelan County, Washington
Cascade Range
Landforms of Chelan County, Washington
North American 2000 m summits